Sumner is a surname. It originates from the English-language word that is spelled, in modern English, summoner, denoting a person who serves a summons. In Geoffrey Chaucer's The Canterbury Tales, one of the characters is a summoner (see "The Summoner's Tale"); a Middle English spelling is Somonour. Other spellings include Sumpner, Somner, and Summoner. Among the notable people with this surname are the following:

 Allen Melancthon Sumner (1882–1918), American Marine
 Andrew Sumner, British movie journalist and publisher
 Benedict Humphrey Sumner (1893–1951), usually known as Humphrey Sumner, English historian
 Bernard Sumner (born 1956), British musician
 Brian Sumner (born 1979), British skateboarder
 Bruce Sumner (1924–2018), American Superior Court Judge
 Byron Sumner (born 1991), Australian rules footballer
 Carl Sumner (1908–1999), American baseball player
 Charles Sumner (bishop) (1790–1874), Anglican bishop (Landaff and then Winchester)
 Charles Sumner (1811–1874), American politician
 Charlie Sumner (1930–2015), American football player and coach
 Charlotte Sumner, American neurologist
 Chris Sumner (born 1943), former Australian politician
 Cid Ricketts Sumner (1890–1970), American novelist
 Claude Sumner (1919–2012), Canadian philosopher
 Edmond Sumner (born 1995), American basketball player, NBA, Indiana Pacers
 Edwin Vose "Bull" Sumner (1797–1863), American Civil War general
 Elizabeth Keawepoʻoʻole Sumner (1850–1911), Hawaiian chiefess and lady-in-waiting
 Francis Bertody Sumner (1874–1945), American ichthyologist, zoologist and writer
 Geoffrey Sumner (1908–1989), British actor, commentator for British Movietone News
 Gordon Sumner, former Australian rules footballer
 Sting (born Gordon Matthew Thomas Sumner in 1951), lead singer of British Band The Police
 Gregory Sumner, history professor and biographer
 Heywood Sumner (1853–1940), English artist, designer, writer and archaeologist
 Humphrey Sumner (1743–1814), English Anglican priest and educationalist
 Increase Sumner (1746–1799), American politician and jurist
 J. D. Sumner (1924–1998), American singer and songwriter
 James B. Sumner (1887–1955), American biochemist
 Jessie Sumner (1898–1994), U.S. Representative from Illinois
 Jethro Sumner (1733–1785), American Revolutionary War general
 Joe Sumner (born 1976), British musician
 John Bird Sumner (1780–1862), Anglican bishop/Archbishop of Canterbury
 John Robert Sumner (1850–1933), English amateur footballer, played in 1873 FA Cup Final (grandson of John Bird Sumner)
 John S. Sumner (1876–1971), head of New York Society for the Suppression of Vice from 1915 to 1950
 John Sumner (actor, born 1951), British actor
 John Sumner (actor, died 1649) (died May 1649), English theatre actor
 Joseph Burton Sumner (1837–1920), American settler
 Kelly Sumner (born 1961), British businessman
 L. W. Sumner (born 1941), Canadian philosopher
 Liam Sumner (born 1993), former professional Australian rules footballer
 Major "Moogy" Sumner, Aboriginal Australian elder, dancer and cultural adviser
 Mary Lou Sumner (1927–2002), American politician
 Mary Sumner (1828–1921), founder of the Mothers' Union
 Mickey Sumner (born 1984), English actress
 Nancy Sumner (1839–1895), Hawaiian chiefess and lady-in-waiting
 Peter Sumner (1942–2016), Australian actor, director and writer
 Phil Sumner (born 1990), cornet, keyboard and guitar player
 Robert Sumner (1922–2016), American evangelist and writer
 Samuel S. Sumner (1842–1937), American general
 Sarah Sumner, American evangelical theologian
 Sophie Sumner (born 1990), British fashion model
 Steve Sumner (1955–2017), New Zealand football player
 T. B. Sumner (1857–1934), American politician
 Thomas Hubbard Sumner (1807–1876), American mariner
 Tim Sumner (footballer) (born 1994), Australian rules footballer
 Tim Sumner (physicist), Professor of Experimental Physics at Imperial College London
 Walt Sumner (born 1947), American football player
 William Graham Sumner (1840–1910), American sociologist
 William H. Sumner (1780–1861), Boston historical figure
 William Keolaloa Sumner (1816–1885), Hawaiian chief and landholder

See also
Summer (surname)
Sumners, surname

English-language surnames
Occupational surnames